The PFF National Training Center or the National Football Center is an association football training ground at the San Lazaro Leisure and Business Park in Carmona, Cavite.

History
Plans to construct a football facility in Carmona, Cavite was announced as early as June 2014.

The groundbreaking ceremony for the facility located within the San Lazaro Leisure and Business Park of the Manila Jockey Club was held on 30 November 2014 and was led by then FIFA President Sepp Blatter. It was projected to be complete by 2015 but the facility was inaugurated two years later.

The facility was formally inaugurated on 9 September 2017 which included the turnover ceremony of its main field, the FIFA Football Turf. After the launch the first two football matches were held in field. The first women's football match held in the field was a friendly between the University of the Philippines and the De La Salle University while the first men's football match was an official Ang Liga pre-season match between the San Beda College and the Ateneo de Manila University. The former secured a 3–0 win over the latter. On the same day the groundbreaking ceremony for a new PFF House of Football within the center was made.

Football fields

FIFA Football Turf
The training center hosts an international-sized artificial turf, the FIFA Football Turf which is accredited with a FIFA two-star field rating. The pitch of the artificial pitch was by United States firm, ATC Global and has a dimension of 105 x 68 m (344 x 223 ft). Upon its inauguration the seating capacity of the FIFA Football Turf is about 1,000 to 1,200. Earlier in 2014, plans of a viewing area of about 20,000 to 30,000 capacity was reported.

Lighting towers with an intensity of 900 lux is planned to be installed by the end of 2018. There are plans to convert the pitch into a stadium.

Other pitches
Two miniature artificial turfs measuring  will be installed beside the main football pitch which are meant for recreation use and hosting of festival competitions. Likewise the grass area in the middle of the Manila Jockey Club's racetrack is also planned to be converted into a football field.

Use
The facility is planned to serve as the training ground of both the men's and women's national football teams of the Philippines. Both senior and youth teams will utilize the facility. Within September 2017, the Youth Football League plans to hold their matches at the center.

The center hosted matches of the second roundof the 2017 PFF Women's League. The venue also hosted a Philippines Football League match between Meralco Manila and Ceres-Negros on 24 November 2017. The match is designated as a home game of Meralco Manila but the club's designated venue, the Rizal Memorial Stadium is unavailable at the given date due to reservation by the NCAA. The women's national team used the venue in March 2018 as part of their preparation for their 2018 AFC Women's Asian Cup stint.

Ownership
The Manila Jockey Club leases the land where the facility stands to the Philippine Football Federation. The PFF has leasing rights to the land which is valid until 2039.

References 

Football venues in the Philippines
Association football training grounds in the Philippines
Sports complexes in the Philippines
Buildings and structures in Cavite
National football academies